Drwały may refer to the following places:
Drwały, Gmina Bielsk in Masovian Voivodeship (east-central Poland)
Drwały, Gmina Wyszogród in Masovian Voivodeship (east-central Poland)
Drwały, Pułtusk County in Masovian Voivodeship (east-central Poland)